Takwa Milinga is a settlement in Kenya's Coast Province.

References 

Populated places in Coast Province